International religious television broadcasters broadcast from a host nation to another nation or nations. Such operations are mostly operated from the United States of America, Portugal and Italy, in conjunction with a religious organization having links to many churches or shrines who produce their own programs. The following is a list of such broadcasters with links to entries about each one:

 Angelus TV – a Catholic television network based near the Sanctuary of Our Lady of Fatima in Cova da Iria, Fatima, Portugal.
 CatholicTV – a Catholic television network based in Watertown, Massachusetts, United States of America.
 Eternal Word Television Network (EWTN) – major worldwide Catholic radio and television broadcaster based in Alabama, United States of America; largest religious television network in the world.
 KTO (TV channel) – French-speaking Catholic television network broadcasting France, Belgium, Switzerland; based Malakoff near Paris.
 Rede Vida – Brazilian Catholic television network headquartered in São José do Rio Preto, São Paulo.
 Salt + Light Television – Canada's Catholic television network, available on satellite.
 Telepace – a Catholic television network based in Cerna, province of Verona, Italy, which includes some programming from Vatican Media.
 Trinity Broadcasting Network – broadcasting from studios in California and Texas, United States of America, and transmitting by a network of terrestrial transmitters in various countries linked by the use of global satellite services.
 Three Angels Broadcasting Network – a radio and television station based in Illinois, United States of America.
 Universal Living Faith Network – a television network owned by the Brazilian Christian denomination Universal Church of the Kingdom of God based in Texas, United States of America serving nationwide.
 Padre Pio TV – a Catholic television network based near the Sanctuary of Saint Pio of Pietrelcina in San Giovanni Rotondo, Italy.
 Shalom World – a 24/7 Commercial-Free, Catholic, Family Entertainment Channel.

See also
 Catholic television
 Catholic television channels
 Catholic television networks
 International radio broadcasters
 International religious radio broadcasters
 International television broadcasters

References

Religious mass media
Christian television
All articles to be expanded
Articles to be expanded from October 2010
Television organizations